Comic book advertisements are a common feature in American comic books mainly from the 1940s onwards. As these advertisements were directed at young people, many made sensational claims, and sold the products for a few dollars or less, to be sent to a post office box. Products offered included novelty items, toys, and self-improvement courses such as drawing and body building.

Companies 

The Johnson Smith Company placed advertisements for gadgets and toys that appeared on the back cover of many historically significant comic books, including Action Comics #1 (June 1938) (the first appearance of the character Superman) and Detective Comics #27 (May 1939) (the first appearance of the character Batman).

Notable products offered 

 Charles Atlas illustrated bodybuilding book
 Disappearing ink
 Dribble glass
 Itching powder
 Joy buzzer
 Latex mask
 Potato gun
 Sea-Monkeys
 Sneezing powder
 Squirting flower
 Stink bomb
 Whoopee cushion
 X-ray specs

The ads also included recruitment of youngsters to act as salespeople for products such as greeting cards and the national newspaper Grit.

See also 

 Advertising to children
 Soren Sorensen Adams – a Danish-American inventor and manufacturer of novelty products, including the joy buzzer.
 Toy advertising

References

Further reading 
  156 pages.

External links
 

Comics
Advertisements